Eljon Sota (born 24 June 1998) is an Albanian footballer who plays as a defender for Partizani in the Kategoria Superiore

References

1998 births
Living people
KF Apolonia Fier players
Kategoria e Parë players
Kategoria Superiore players
Albanian footballers
Association football midfielders
Association football forwards
Association football wingers